Gisagara is a district (akarere) in Southern Province, Rwanda. Its headquarters is Ndora.

Geography 
The district lies just to the East of Butare city, along the border with Burundi.

Where of gisagara district office building ,sector, cell 
Gisagara district is divided into 13 sectors (imirenge): Gikonko, Gishubi, Kansi, Kibilizi, Kigembe, Mamba, Muganza, Mugombwa, Mukindo, Musha, Ndora, Nyanza and Save.

Mugombwa refugee camp 
The Mugombwa refugee camp is home to over 7300 Congolese refugees. A Turi Kumwe Centre, housing "a Police post as well as migration and camp management offices" was opened in the camp in 2014.

References 

 
 Inzego.doc — Province, District and Sector information from MINALOC, the Rwanda ministry of local government.

Southern Province, Rwanda
Districts of Rwanda
Refugee camps in Rwanda